Gaua  (formerly known as Santa Maria Island) is the largest and second most populous of the Banks Islands in Torba Province in northern Vanuatu. It covers 342 km².

Geography 

Gaua is subject to frequent earthquakes and cyclones. The climate is humid tropical; the average annual rainfall exceeds 3500 mm. It has rugged terrain, reaching up to Mount Gharat (797 m), the peak of the active stratovolcano which lies at the center of the island. Its most recent eruption was in 2013. The volcano has a 6 × 9 km caldera, within which lies a crater lake, known as Lake Letas, which is the largest lake in Vanuatu. To the east of the lake is Siri Waterfall (120 m drop).

Natural history
The upper slopes of the island have been recognised as an Important Bird Area (IBA) by BirdLife International, because they support populations of Vanuatu megapodes, Vanuatu imperial pigeons, Tanna fruit doves, red-bellied fruit doves, palm lorikeets, cardinal myzomelas, fan-tailed gerygones, long-tailed trillers, streaked fantails, Melanesian flycatchers, southern shrikebills, Vanuatu white-eyes, and red-headed parrotfinches. Other animals found there include long-tailed fruit bats, Vanuatu flying foxes, and coconut crabs.

Population and languages 
In 2009, the island had a population of 2,491, and an annual growth rate of 2.0 percent. 
The inhabitants are scattered among various coastal villages on the western, southern and northeastern sides of the island. The eastern side has a few hamlets with an immigrant community, the members of which have come from the two smaller islands Merig and Merelava, that lie southeast of Gaua. The largest village on Gaua is Jolap , on the west coast.

In addition to Mwerlap (the language of the immigrant population), there are five languages traditionally spoken on Gaua: Lakon (also called Vuré), Olrat, Koro, Dorig, and Nume.

Economy 
The livelihood of the people of Gaua is based on the agricultural economy that is traditional throughout of Melanesia: a combination of fishing and horticulture. 
Their principal exports are copra and cacao.

The island is served by Gaua Airport, which is located in the northeast corner of the island.

Names
The modern name Gaua is pronounced  in Bislama, the lingua franca of Vanuatu, and in French or English.

In the local Banks languages, the island was traditionally known not by one name, but two. One name reconstructs in Proto-Torres-Banks as a form *ɣaua , the other one as *laᵑgona. These respectively referred to the northeast half of the island, and its southwestern half (where one finds Lakona Bay, and also where the Lakon language is spoken). 

Thus the Mota language, which missionaries used when naming most places in the Banks Islands, has the forms Gaua  and Lakona ; Mwotlap has respectively Agō  and Alkon ; Olrat and Lakon have Gaō  and Lakon ; Mwerlap has Gō  and Lakon . 

Some modern languages have generalised one of these two etyma to refer to the whole island. Thus it is called Gog  in Nume, Gō  in Koro (both < *ɣaua), Lkon  in Dorig (< *laᵑgona).

History
Gaua was first sighted by Europeans during the Spanish expedition of Pedro Fernández de Quirós, from 25 to 29 April 1606. The island’s name was then charted as Santa María.

Gallery

References

External links

Our Forest our Future; Managing Biodiversity in the South Pacific, Gaua Island, Vanuatu, Rudolf Hahn, CTA FAO 2013, youtube video
Volcano World: Gaua
Detailed list and map of the Banks and Torres languages, including those of Gaua

Islands of Vanuatu
Volcanoes of Vanuatu
Calderas of Oceania
Volcanic crater lakes
Torba Province
Stratovolcanoes
Important Bird Areas of Vanuatu